BNS Sagar is a Type 010 minesweeper of the Bangladeshi Navy. She has served in the Bangladeshi Navy since 1995.

Career
Bangladesh government ordered it from China in 1993. First of class handed over 18 December 1994. BNS Sagar was commissioned in the Bangladesh Navy on 27 April 1995. She is currently being used as a patrol ship.

She went through an upgrade program in 1998 in which her Tamir II hull mounted active search and attack sonar was replaced by Celsius Tech CMAS36/29 mine detection sonar.

BNS Sagar took part in the rescue operation of the sunken fishing vessel FV Bandhan in Chittagong on 28 November 2014.

Armament
The ship carries two Type 76 twin 37 mm naval guns of 63 cal. which can be used in both anti-surface and anti-air role. She also carries two Type 61 25mm AAA guns which can fire at a rate of 70-300rpm with a 2.3 km range. Two twin 14.5 machine guns are also carried. For the anti-submarine role, she carries two BMB-2 projectors with 20 depth charges. She can also carry 12-16 mines.

See also
 List of active ships of the Bangladesh Navy

References

Ships of the Bangladesh Navy
Minesweepers of the Bangladesh Navy